The Epigravettian (Greek: epi "above, on top of", and Gravettian) was one of the last archaeological industries and cultures of the European Upper Paleolithic. It emerged after the Last Glacial Maximum around ~21,000 cal. BP or 19,050 BC, and is considered to be a cultural derivative of the Gravettian culture. Initially named Tardigravettian (Late Gravettian) in 1964 by Georges Laplace in reference to several lithic industries found in Italy, it was later renamed in order to better emphasize its independent character.

Three subphases, the Early Epigravettian (20,000 to 16,000 BP), the Evolved Epigravettian (16,000 to 14,000 BP) and the Final Epigravettian (14,000 to 8,000 BP), have been established, that were further subdivided and reclassified. In this sense, the Epigravettian is simply the Gravettian after ~21,000 BP, when the Solutrean had replaced the Gravettian in most of France and Spain.

Several Epigravettian cultural centers have developed contemporaneously after 22,000 years BP in Europe. These range across southern, central and most of eastern Europe, including south-western France, Italy, the Balkans, the Caucasus, Ukraine and Western Russia to the banks of the Volga River.

Its lithic complex was first documented at numerous sites in Italy. Great geographical and local variability of the facies is present, 
however all sites are characterized by the predominance of microliths, such as backed blades, backed points, and bladelets with retouched end.

The Epigravettian is the last stage of the Upper Paleolithic succeeded by Mesolithic cultures after 10,000 BP.

In a genetic study published in Nature in May 2016, the remains an Epigravettian male from Ripari Villabruna in Italy were examined. He carried the paternal haplogroup R1b1 and the maternal haplogroup U5b. An Epigravettian from the Satsurblia Cave in Georgia examined in a previous study has been found to be carrying the paternal haplogroup J2 and the maternal haplogroup K3.

References

Sources

 

Upper Paleolithic cultures of Europe
Industries (archaeology)
Archaeological cultures of Eastern Europe
Archaeological cultures of Southeastern Europe
Archaeological cultures of Southern Europe
Archaeological cultures in Austria
Archaeological cultures in Croatia
Archaeological cultures in Italy
Archaeological cultures in Montenegro
Archaeological cultures in Romania
Archaeological cultures in Serbia
Archaeological cultures in Slovakia
Archaeological cultures in Ukraine
Stone Age Austria